Kuwait competed at the 2019 World Aquatics Championships in Gwangju, South Korea from 12 to 28 July.

Diving

Kuwait entered four divers.

Men

Swimming

Kuwait entered four swimmers.

Men

References

Nations at the 2019 World Aquatics Championships
2019 in Kuwaiti sport
Kuwait at the World Aquatics Championships